The 1984 Borden Classic  was a women's tennis tournament played on outdoor hard courts in Tokyo, Japan that was part of the 1984 Virginia Slims World Championship Series. The tournament was held from 1 October through 7 October 1984. Third-seeded Etsuko Inoue won the singles title.

Finals

Singles
 Etsuko Inoue defeated  Beth Herr 6–0, 6–0
 It was Inoue's 1st title of the year and the 2nd of her career.

Doubles
 Mercedes Paz /  Ronni Reis defeated  Emilse Raponi-Longo /  Adriana Villagrán-Reami 6–4, 7–5
 It was Paz's 1st career title. It was Reis' 1st career title.

References

External links
 ITF tournament edition details

Borden Classic
Tennis tournaments in Japan
Borden Classic
Borden Classic